Fred Herbert Brown (April 12, 1879February 3, 1955) was an American lawyer, baseball player, and politician from New Hampshire. A member of the Democratic Party, Brown was the 59th governor of New Hampshire and a United States Senator.

Brown attended Dartmouth College and played for the Boston Beaneaters of Major League Baseball’s National League in 1901 and 1902. He earned a law degree at Boston University and went into legal practice after he retired from baseball. Brown was elected mayor of Somersworth, New Hampshire, and appointed United States Attorney for the District of New Hampshire.

Brown was elected Governor in 1922, but was defeated for reelection in 1924. After serving on the Public Service Commission, he was elected to the Senate in 1932. He lost his reelection bid in 1938, and served as Comptroller General of the United States from 1939 to 1940, when he resigned due to poor health.

Early life
Brown was born on April 12, 1879, to Dana and Nellie Brown in Ossipee, New Hampshire. He was an only child. Brown attended Dow Academy, and graduated in 1897. He played semi-professional baseball in Somersworth, New Hampshire, before he enrolled at Dartmouth College. He played college baseball for the Dartmouth Big Green team as a catcher.

Professional baseball career

Frank Selee of the Boston Beaneaters, who played in the National League of Major League Baseball, signed Brown before the 1901 season. Brown made his major league debut on May 4, 1901, as a right fielder. He played in seven games for the Beaneaters in 1901, before he was demoted to the Providence Grays of the Class A Eastern League. He played in two games for the Beaneaters in 1902, and spent the majority of the 1902 season with Providence. He played nine games for the Beaneaters over the course of those two seasons, seven in the outfield, batting .200 (4-for-20) and not making an error in 10 chances in the field.

In 1903, Brown coached the Dartmouth Big Green, and played for Providence and the Jersey City Skeeters, also of the Eastern League. He played for the Haverhill Hustlers of the Class B New England League in 1904, and returned to Haverhill in 1905 and 1906. Brown suffered from pneumonia early in 1906, and was not at full strength even after he recovered. Haverhill released him during the season. Brown played baseball as a semi-professional in Somersworth in 1907.

Political career
During his baseball career, Brown attended the Boston University School of Law in 1904 and 1905, earning a law degree. He moved to Somersworth in August 1906 to work in law for James A. Edgerly. He entered into a partnership with Edgerly, passed the bar examination in June 1907, and took over the practice after Edgerly's death. He served as city solicitor for Somersworth from 1908 to 1914. He was a presidential elector in the 1912 election and was elected mayor of Somersworth in March 1914. President Woodrow Wilson nominated Brown to be the United States Attorney for the District of New Hampshire in June 1914, and reappointed him in July 1918. Brown resigned in April 1922.

Brown entered the 1922 election for Governor of New Hampshire. He faced two candidates in the Democratic Party primary election, and won. He defeated Republican Windsor H. Goodnow in the general election. As governor, he cut spending below the levels estimated by the New Hampshire Legislature and advocated for tax cuts. Brown was entered into nomination at the 1924 Democratic National Convention. He ran for reelection as governor in 1924, and he was renominated without opposition. He lost the general election to Republican John Gilbert Winant, while Republican Calvin Coolidge carried the state in the 1924 presidential election. After Winant took office in 1925, he nominated Brown for a six-year term on the New Hampshire Public Service Commission. He succeeded Thomas Worthen on the commission on June 1, 1925.

In January 1932, Democrats from Strafford County began to recruit Brown to enter the 1932 election for the United States Senate. He ran, facing two candidates in the Democratic primary election, and won. Brown defeated Republican incumbent George H. Moses in the general election, with the assistance of Franklin D. Roosevelt's landslide victory in the 1932 presidential election. In the Senate, Brown supported Roosevelt's New Deal, served on the joint committee that investigated the Tennessee Valley Authority, voted to confirm Hugo Black to the Supreme Court of the United States and chaired the Senate Commerce Committee's Subcommittee on Communications. Brown was not opposed when he ran for renomination in the 1938 election, but he lost in the general election to Republican Charles W. Tobey.

Roosevelt appointed Brown to a 15-year term as Comptroller General of the United States in March 1939, and his nomination was approved in April. As comptroller general, he supported the decision to use marble from Vermont in the construction of the Jefferson Memorial and ruled that states could not collect taxes from the federal government. He also approved an $11 million contract ($ in current dollar terms) for cement to use in the construction of the Shasta Dam.

Brown suffered a stroke in December 1939, and resigned as Comptroller General due to poor health in June 1940. The next month, Roosevelt nominated Brown to the United States Tariff Commission, and he was confirmed on August 1. He resigned the position in 1941. Brown remained in New Hampshire, where he met with President Harry S. Truman during his tour through New Hampshire during the 1952 presidential election.

Personal life
Brown married Edna McHarg, who worked as a secretary in the New Hampshire State House, in May 1925. They did not have children.

Brown died from cardiac arrest in his home in Somersworth on February 3, 1955.

See also
List of American sportsperson-politicians

References

External links

1879 births
1955 deaths
American athlete-politicians
Democratic Party governors of New Hampshire
Candidates in the 1924 United States presidential election
20th-century American politicians
Boston University School of Law alumni
Democratic Party United States senators from New Hampshire
Dartmouth Big Green baseball coaches
Dartmouth Big Green baseball players
People from Somersworth, New Hampshire
Major League Baseball outfielders
Boston Beaneaters players
Jersey City Skeeters players
Providence Clamdiggers (baseball) players
Providence Grays (minor league) players
Sacramento (minor league baseball) players
Nashua (minor league baseball) players
Haverhill Hustlers players
Baseball players from New Hampshire
Sportspeople from Strafford County, New Hampshire
United States Attorneys for the District of New Hampshire
1912 United States presidential electors